Allan Sinclair may refer to:

 Allan Sinclair (footballer), Australian rules footballer
 Allan Sinclair (sport shooter), New Zealand shooter
 Allan Sinclair (Acadia president), former Acadia University president